Annar Ryen (19 October 1909, Os, Hedmark – 9 March 1985) was a Norwegian cross-country skier who competed in the 1930s.

He won a gold medal in the 4 × 10 km relay at the 1937 FIS Nordic World Ski Championships. Because of his successes, Ryen was awarded the Holmenkollen medal in 1940 (shared with Oscar Gjøslien). This was the last medal before World War II.

He represented the clubs Tynset IF and IL Nansen. After retiring he was a farmer in Dalsbygda in Os, Hedmark. He died in 1985.

Cross-country skiing results
All results are sourced from the International Ski Federation (FIS).

World Championships
 1 medal – (1 gold)

References

1909 births
1985 deaths
People from Os, Innlandet
Norwegian male cross-country skiers
Holmenkollen medalists
FIS Nordic World Ski Championships medalists in cross-country skiing
Sportspeople from Innlandet